The 2005 Indonesia Open in badminton was held in Jakarta, from September 19 to September 25, 2005. It was a six-star tournament and the prize money was US$250,000.

Final results

References 
 badminton.de

Indonesia Open (badminton)
Indonesia
Sports competitions in Jakarta
2005 in Indonesian sport